Eric Carter (born January 23, 1969 in Jesup, Georgia) was a football player in the Canadian Football League for eleven seasons. Carter played as a cornerback for the Hamilton Tiger-Cats from 1994-1998, the BC Lions from 1999-2003 and the Winnipeg Blue Bombers in 2004. He was a CFL All-Star four times and won a Grey Cup for the Lions in 2000. He played college football at Knoxville College.

Carter was selected to the Lions' 2004 50th Anniversary Dream Team.

References

1969 births
Living people
People from Jesup, Georgia
American players of Canadian football
Knoxville Bulldogs football players
Canadian football defensive backs
Hamilton Tiger-Cats players
BC Lions players
Winnipeg Blue Bombers players